Angela Robinson may refer to:

 Angela Robinson (director) (born 1971), American film and television director
 Angela Robinson (actress), American actress and singer

See also
 Angel Robinson (disambiguation)